Dmitri Kuzmin (born September 9, 1977) is a Russian-born Kyrgyzstani former swimmer, who specialized in middle-distance freestyle events. He is a single-time Olympian (2000), and a former Kyrgyzstan record holder in the 200 and 400 m freestyle. While playing for the Russian senior team, Kuzmin also earned a bronze medal, along with Maksim Korsunov, Dmitry Chernyshov, and Andrey Kapralov, in the 4×200 m freestyle relay at the 1999 European Aquatics Championships in Istanbul, Turkey.

Kuzmin competed in three swimming events at the 2000 Summer Olympics in Sydney. He cleared a FINA B-standard of 1:51.90 from the Russian National Championships in Moscow. On the first day of the Games, Kuzmin teamed up with Alexei Pavlov, Konstantin Ushkov, and another Russian import Sergey Ashihmin in the 4×100 m freestyle relay. Kuzmin swam the third leg in heat two and recorded a split of 50.61, but the Kyrgyz rounded out an eight-team field to last place and twentieth overall with a final time of 3:25.03. In the 200 m freestyle, Kuzmin placed twenty-eighth on the morning prelims. Swimming in heat four, Kuzmin edged out Moldova's Andrei Cecan to take a fifth spot by three-tenths of a second (0.30) in 1:52.93. Two days later, in the 4×200 m freestyle relay, Kuzmin, along with Andrei Pakin, Aleksandr Shilin, and Ivan Ivanov, were disqualified from heat one for an early takeoff during the lead-off leg.

References

External links
 

1977 births
Living people
Kyrgyzstani male freestyle swimmers
Russian male freestyle swimmers
Olympic swimmers of Kyrgyzstan
Swimmers at the 2000 Summer Olympics
Russian emigrants to Kyrgyzstan
Kyrgyzstani people of Russian descent
European Aquatics Championships medalists in swimming